Cysteine desulfurase, mitochondrial is an enzyme that in humans is encoded by the NFS1 gene.

Iron-sulfur clusters are required for the function of many cellular enzymes. The protein encoded by this gene supplies inorganic sulfur to these clusters by removing the sulfur from cysteine, creating alanine in the process. This gene uses alternate in-frame translation initiation sites to generate mitochondrial forms and cytoplasmic/nuclear forms. Selection of the alternative initiation sites is determined by the cytosolic pH. The encoded protein belongs to the class-V family of pyridoxal phosphate-dependent aminotransferases.

References

Further reading